Acacia incongesta, also known as Peak Charles wattle, is a shrub belonging to the genus Acacia and the subgenus Juliflorae that is endemic to a small area in south western Australia

Description
Like most species of Acacia it has phyllodes rather than true leaves. The evergreen, ascending to erect phyllodes have a narrowly elliptic shape and can be incurved. It blooms from March to June producing cream flowers. The pendant, thinly-coriaceous and glabrous seed pods that form after flowering have a linear shape but are 
raised over and constricted between the seeds.

Distribution
It is native to a small area near Peak Charles in Peak Charles National Park in the Goldfields-Esperance region of Western Australia where it is found situated on granite mountain slopes and clay flats growing in sandy soils.

See also
List of Acacia species

References

incongesta
Acacias of Western Australia
Plants described in 1995
Taxa named by Bruce Maslin